Al-Qabu (also spelled Kabu) is a town in central Syria, administratively part of the Homs Governorate, northwest of Homs. Nearby localities include al-Shinyah to the north, Taldou and Kafr Laha to the northeast, Sharqliyya to the east, al-Mahfurah to the south, Rabah to the southwest and Fahel to the west. According to the Syria Central Bureau of Statistics (CBS), al-Qabu had a population of 4,870 in the 2004 census. The inhabitants are predominantly Alawites.

References

Bibliography

 

Populated places in Homs District
Towns in Syria
Alawite communities in Syria